Eberstalzell is a municipality in the district of Wels-Land in the Austrian state of Upper Austria.

Geography
Eberstalzell lies in the Hausruckviertel. About 8 percent of the municipality is forest, and 83 percent is farmland.

References

Cities and towns in Wels-Land District